Final league standings for the 1921-22 St. Louis Soccer League.

League standings

External links
St. Louis Soccer Leagues (RSSSF)
The Year in American Soccer - 1922

1921-22
1921–22 domestic association football leagues
1921–22 in American soccer
St Louis Soccer
St Louis Soccer